Kailis may refer to:

 Michael Kailis (1929–1999), Australian businessman, founder of MG Kailis Group
 Patricia Kailis (1933–2020), Australian geneticist, neurologist and director of MG Kailis Group
 MG Kailis Group, Australian seafood and pearling business
 Kailis Brothers, Australian seafood and restaurant business